The Otago cricket team, nicknamed the Volts since the 1997–98 season, are a New Zealand first-class cricket team which first played representative cricket in 1864. The team represents the Otago, Southland and North Otago regions of New Zealand's South Island. Their main governing board is the Otago Cricket Association which is one of six major associations that make up New Zealand Cricket.

The team plays most of its home games at the University Oval in Dunedin, but occasionally plays games at the Events Centre in Queenstown, Queen's Park Ground in Invercargill and Molyneux Park in Alexandra. The team plays first-class, List A and Twenty20 matches against other New Zealand provincial sides, although in the past has also played against touring sides.

The team's current coach is Dion Ebrahim.

Honours
 Plunket Shield (13)
1924–25, 1932–33, 1947–48, 1950–51, 1952–53, 1957–58, 1969–70, 1971–72, 1974–75, 1976–77, 1978–79, 1985–86, 1987–88

 The Ford Trophy (2)
1987–88, 2007–08

 Men's Super Smash (2)
2008–09, 2012–13

First-class records

Team totals
 Highest total for – 651/9 declared v Wellington at University Oval, Dunedin, 2012/13
 Highest total against – 777 by Canterbury at Lancaster Park, Christchurch, 1996/97
 Lowest total for – 34 v Wellington at Carisbrook, Dunedin, 1956/57
 Lowest total against – 25 by Canterbury at Hagley Oval, Christchurch, 1866/67

Individual batting
 Highest score – 385, B Sutcliffe against Canterbury at Lanaster Park, Christchurch, 1952/53
 Most runs in season – 1,027 GM Turner, 1975/76
 Most runs in career – 6,589 CD Cumming, 2000/01–2011/12

Highest partnership for each wicket
 1st – 373 B Sutcliffe and L Watt v Auckland at Auckland, 1950/51
 2nd – 254 KJ Burns and KR Rutherford v Wellington at Oamaru, 1987/88
 3rd – 306 SB Haig and NT Broom v Central Districts at Napier, 2009/10
 4th – 239 NB Beard and NT Broom v Auckland at Hamilton, 2012/13
 5th – 266 B Sutcliffe and WS Haig v Auckland at Dunedin, 1949/50
 6th – 256 NF Kelly and MW Chu v Central Districts at Dunedin, 2021/22
 7th – 190 NG Smith and MJG Rippon v Northern Districts at Dunedin, 2019/20
 8th – 165* JN Crawford and AG Eckhold v Wellington at Wellington, 1914/15
 9th – 208 WC McSkimming and BE Scott v Auckland at Auckland, 2004/05
 10th – 184 RC Blunt and W Hawksworth v Canterbury at Christchurch, 1931/32

Bowling

Best inning bowling – 9/50 AH Fisher v Queensland at Dunedin, 1896/97
Best match bowling figures – 15/94 FH Cooke v Canterbury at Christchurch, 1882/83
Most wickets in season – 54 SL Boock, 1978/79
Most wickets in career – 399 SL Boock, 1973/74–1990/91

Contracted players
The following players are contracted to Otago or have New Zealand Cricket ctrneal contracts. Other, non-contracted players may play for the side.

Grounds
University Oval is used in Dunedin, with occasional matches in Invercargill (Queen's Park) and at the Queenstown Events Centre. Many matches have been played at Molyneux Park in Alexandra in recent decades, particularly during the Christmas-New Year holiday season. The warm, dry summer climate of Central Otago can make for better cricketing conditions than the wetter coastal areas. Oamaru (Whitestone Centennial Park) has been used in the past but not recently.

Twenty20 Champions League
A rapid expansion of Twenty20 cricket led to the creation of the Twenty20 Champions League. It was a competition between various teams from the domestic Twenty20 competitions of Australia, South Africa, Pakistan, India, England, Sri Lanka, West Indies and New Zealand.

In the 2008/09 domestic season of the State Twenty20, Otago came out as the champions, and so were eligible to compete in the inaugural Twenty20 Champions League. However, they lost both their opening games in the competition and so weren't able to progress further.

The Volts again qualified for the league in the 2013 season where they were much more successful entering the competition having won a string of Twenty20 matches which eventually ended at fifteen when they lost the Rajasthan Royals in Jaipur.

Notable former players

New Zealand  
Gren Alabaster
Jack Alabaster
Bruce Blair
Stephen Boock
Neil Broom
Lance Cairns
Craig Cumming
Jacob Duffy
Walter Hadlee
Warren Lees
Brendon McCullum
Scott Eade
Nathan McCullum
Noel McGregor
Alex Moir
Aaron Redmond
Mark Richardson
Hamish Rutherford

Ken Rutherford
Bert Sutcliffe
Glenn Turner
Neil Wagner

England 
Matthew Maynard
Dimitri Mascarenhas
Neil Mallender
Jonathan Trott
Steven Finn

Netherlands 
Darron Reekers
Michael Rippon
Ryan ten Doeschate

Canada 
Ian Billcliff

References

Further reading
 "Sixty Years of Cricket", Otago Daily Times, 13 February 1937

External links
 

New Zealand first-class cricket teams
 
Cricket clubs established in 1864
Cricket in Otago
Super Smash (cricket)